5208 Royer is a stony Marian asteroid from the central regions of the asteroid belt, approximately  in diameter. It was discovered on 6 February 1989, by astronomer Eleanor Helin at the Palomar Observatory. The S-type asteroid has a rotation period of 3.87 hours and was named after American priest and amateur astronomer, Ronald Royer.

Orbit and classification 

Royer is a member of the Maria family, a large family of stony asteroids with nearly 3,000 known members.

It orbits the Sun in the central asteroid belt at a distance of 2.5–2.7 AU once every 4 years and 2 months (1,535 days; semi-major axis of 2.6 AU). Its orbit has an eccentricity of 0.05 and an inclination of 16° with respect to the ecliptic. The body's observation arc begins with a precovery taken at Palomar Observatory in November 1953, more than 35 years prior to its official discovery observation.

Naming 

This minor planet was named after Reverend Ronald E. Royer, an American priest as well as amateur astronomer and astrophotographer. He has been a member of the Los Angeles Astronomical Society (LAAS) since 1946 and received the G. Bruce Blair Award in 2001. The official naming citation was published by the Minor Planet Center on 6 April 1993.

Physical characteristics 

In the SMASS classification, Royer is a common, stony S-type asteroid.

Rotation period and poles 

In 2004, a rotational lightcurve of Royer was obtained from photometric observations by Brazilian and Argentine astronomers. Lightcurve analysis gave a rotation period of 3.866 hours with a brightness amplitude of 0.44 magnitude. In 2016, a modeled lightcurves using photometric data from various sources, rendered a sidereal period of 3.88494 and two spin axes of (258.0°, 74.0°) and (54.0°, 37.0°) in ecliptic coordinates.

Diameter and albedo 

According to the survey carried out by the NEOWISE mission of NASA's Wide-field Infrared Survey Explorer, Royer measures 7.884 and 8.081 kilometers in diameter and its surface has an albedo of 0.2854 and 0.270, respectively, while the Collaborative Asteroid Lightcurve Link assumes a standard albedo for stony asteroids of 0.20 and calculates a diameter of 9.40 kilometers based on an absolute magnitude of 12.5.

References

External links 
 Royer Oaks Observatory, in Springville, California
 Holy Cross Church, Porterville, January 2012
 Lightcurve Database Query (LCDB), at www.minorplanet.info
 Dictionary of Minor Planet Names, Google books
 Discovery Circumstances: Numbered Minor Planets (5001)-(10000) – Minor Planet Center
 
 

005208
Discoveries by Eleanor F. Helin
Named minor planets
005208
19890206